The following is a list of Duquesne Dukes men's basketball head coaches. There have been 17 head coaches of the Dukes in their 106-season history.

Duquesne's current head coach is Keith Dambrot. He was hired as the Dukes' head coach in March 2017, replacing Jim Ferry, who was fired after the 2016–17 season.

References

Duquesne

Duquesne Dukes men's basketball coaches